Bill Burton was an American Negro league outfielder in the 1910s.

Burton played for the Bacharach Giants in 1918. In six recorded games, he posted six hits in 24 plate appearances.

References

External links
Baseball statistics and player information from Baseball-Reference Black Baseball Stats and Seamheads

Year of birth missing
Year of death missing
Place of birth missing
Place of death missing
Bacharach Giants players
Baseball outfielders